The PZLP.7 was a Polish gull wing monoplane fighter aircraft designed in the early 1930s at the PZL factory in Warsaw. It was the main fighter of the Polish Air Force between 1933 and 1935. The PZLP.7 was replaced in Polish service by its follow-up design, the PZLP.11c. More than 30 PZLP.7 fighters remained in service during the Invasion of Poland, scoring several kills despite its obsolescence.

Design and development
The history of the PZL P.7 began in 1928, when a talented designer named Zygmunt Puławski designed an all-metal, metal-covered monoplane fighter, the PZL P.1. It introduced a high gull wing whose design was called the "Polish wing" or "Pulawski wing." But it remained a prototype because a decision was made to use a licence-produced radial engine in the Polish Air Force fighters. So the next model, the PZL P.6, flown in August 1930, was powered by the Bristol Jupiter VI FH radial engine. Both aircraft were well received and it won the American National Air Races in August–September 1931.

The PZL P.6 did not enter production because a more advanced variant, the PZL P.7, was in development. The first prototype was basically a P.6 with a more powerful Bristol Jupiter VII.F engine. The addition of a supercharger improved performance at higher altitudes. The prototype P.7/I was first flown in October 1930 by Bolesław Orliński. Initially, engine cylinders had individual cylinder fairings. After numerous changes, most noticeably the addition of a wide Townend ring to the engine, and a higher aspect tail, the second prototype P.7/II which had been completed in autumn 1931, was accepted for production with the designation P.7a. The wing was redesigned with slightly increased span, taken from the PZL P.8, and shorter ailerons were used, and structural changes eliminated external ribs from the wing upper surfaces. P.7a production began in mid-1932 and the last of the 149 (plus two prototypes) were completed in 1933. The Polish Air Force received the P.7a in 1933.

Puławski continued to develop the basic design by adding more powerful engines, which resulted in the PZL P.11. Puławski preferred inline engines and also designed the slimmer P.8 and the related P.9 with inline engines but he died in an air accident in March 1931, and these were cancelled. The P.11 became the standard Polish fighter while the PZL P.24 was developed in parallel as an export variant in 1932.

Technical features
The all-metal, duralumin metal-covered strut braced gull-wing monoplane was conventional in layout, and used a conventional fixed undercarriage with a tail skid. The two-spar trapezoid wing was thinner by the fuselage and was covered with a ribbed Wibault type duralumin sheet (although the upper surfaces were smooth) and braced by two struts on each side. The fuselage was framed in a front section and semi-monocoque in mid- and tail sections, oval in cross-section. In keeping with the period, the pilot's cockpit was open with a windshield. Armament was two  machine guns mounted on the fuselage sides which replaced the initially fitted  Vickers E which were re-bored. The aircraft was powered by a  Bristol Jupiter VII F radial engine fitted with a Townend ring and two-blade propeller. A main  fuel tank in the fuselage, behind the engine could be dropped in case of fire emergency.

Operational history
The PZL P.7a entered service in spring 1933, replacing PWS-A (a licence-built Avia BH-33) and PWS-10 fighters. Consequently, the Polish Air Force became the first air force entirely equipped with all-metal monococque fighters. When the P.7 entered service, it was comparable to contemporary designs, but due to rapid progress, it was obsolete by 1939. From 1935, the PZL P.11 replaced the P.7 in most combat units, but was only a slight improvement, while the P.7as were relegated to air schools.

At the outbreak of World War II on 1 September 1939, the Polish Air Force still had 30 PZL P.7a fighters in combat units. A further 40 were with flying schools, and 35 were in reserve or undergoing repairs for a total of 106 aircraft. The P.7as were used by three squadrons, each equipped with 10 aircraft. The Pursuit Brigade's 123rd Squadron was deployed near Warsaw, while the 151st and the 162nd Squadrons were attached to Army units. Despite being obsolete, they engaged the German attackers during the invasion of Poland. In addition to combat units, at least 18 P.7a fighters were used by improvised units from air bases in Dęblin and Ułęż.

Although the P.7 was more manoeuvrable than their opponents and could operate from short or rough fields, almost all the German aircraft were faster, and worse, the Polish aircraft and their engines were worn out from intensive service use. Their two machine guns was also inadequate and jammed frequently while only some replaced the vintage Vickers with the better PWU FK wz.33. Pilots flying the P.7a claimed to have shot down seven German aircraft (two Heinkel He 111s, two Dornier Do 17s, one Henschel Hs 126 and two Messerschmitt Bf 110s), against 22 losses.

Most were destroyed in 1939, in combat or on the ground, but around a dozen were withdrawn to Romania, but were not used in combat there. Some captured P.7s were used by the Germans for training. Several aircraft were captured by the Soviets and were also assigned to training units.

Variants
P.6 precursor design prototypes with lower rated engine; two built.
P.7/I
First prototype.
P.7/II
Second prototype equipped with Townend ring.
P.7a
Serial-built version.

Operators

Luftwaffe operated few captured aircraft for training.

Polish Air Force

Royal Romanian Air Force operated few interned aircraft for training.

Soviet Air Force operated few captured aircraft for training.

Specifications (PZL P.7a)

See also

References

Notes

Bibliography
 Cynk, Jerzy B. History of the Polish Air Force 1918–1968. Reading, Berkshire, UK: Osprey Publishing Ltd., 1972.
 Cynk, Jerzy B. Polish Aircraft, 1893–1939. London: Putnam & Company Ltd., 1971. .
 Eberspacher, Warren A. and Jan P. Koniarek. PZL Fighters Part One - P.1 through P.8. (International Squadron Monograph 2). St. Paul, MN: Phalanx Publishing Co., Ltd., 1995. .
 Glass, Andrzej. Polskie konstrukcje lotnicze 1893–1939 (in Polish: "Polish aviation constructions 1893–1939"). Warszawa, Poland: WKiŁ, 1977. no ISBN.
 Glass, Andrzej. PZL P.7: Cz.1. Gdańsk, Poland: AJ Press, 2000. .
 Kopański, Tomasz J. PZL P.7: Cz.2. Gdańsk, Poland: AJ Press, 2001. .
 Murphy, Justin D. and Matthew A. McNiece. Military Aircraft, 1919–1945: An Illustrated History of their Impact. Santa Barbara, California: ABC-CLIO, 2009. .

Gull-wing aircraft
1930s Polish fighter aircraft
World War II Polish fighter aircraft
PZL aircraft
Single-engined tractor aircraft
Aircraft first flown in 1930